Video capture is the process of converting an analog video signal—such as that produced by a video camera, DVD player, or television tuner—to digital video and sending it to local storage or to external circuitry. The resulting digital data are referred to as a digital video stream, or more often, simply video stream. Depending on the application, a video stream may be recorded as computer files, or sent to a video display, or both.

Devices

Special electronic circuitry is required to capture video from analog video sources. At the system level this function is typically performed by a dedicated video capture device. Such devices typically employ integrated circuit video decoders to convert incoming video signals to a standard digital video format, and additional circuitry to convey the resulting digital video to local storage or to circuitry outside the video capture device, or both. Depending on the device, the resulting video stream may be conveyed to external circuitry via a computer bus (e.g., PCI/104 or PCIe) or a communication interface such as USB, Ethernet or WiFi, or stored in mass-storage memory in the device itself (e.g., digital video recorder).

See also
 TV tuner cards, which employ video capture circuitry to capture broadcast television
 Frame grabber
 Uncompressed video

References 
Convergence Culture. Where Old and New Media Collide, Buying Into American Idol, Henry Jenkins, 2006 New York University Press.

Codecs